Richard White may refer to:

Politicians
Richard White (fl.1397), Member of Parliament (MP) for Norwich in 1397
Richard White (fl. 1402), MP for Great Grimsby in 1402
Richard White (16th century MP), MP for City of York
Richard White (Kentucky politician) (born 1952), 21st-century Kentucky legislator
Richard White (Wisconsin politician), 19th-century Wisconsin legislator
Richard Crawford White (1923–1998), U.S. Representative from Texas (1965–1983)
Richard Smeaton White (1865–1936), Canadian newspaper publisher and political figure

Judges
 Richard Conway White, see List of judges of the Federal Court of Australia and List of judges of the Supreme Court of South Australia
 Richard Weeks White (born 1954), judge of the Supreme Court of New South Wales
Richard White (Irish judge) (died 1367), Lord Chief Justice of Ireland

Sports
Richard White (rugby union) (1925–2012), All Black from 1949 and mayor of Gisborne
Richard White (athlete), British Paralympic medalist
Richard White (cricketer) (born 1934), cricketer

Others
Richard White (mathematician) (1590–1682), or Ricardo Albio, English mathematician and physicist
Richard White of Basingstoke (1539–1611), English jurist and historian, expatriate and Catholic priest
Richard A. White, American public transit official
Richard White, 1st Earl of Bantry (1767–1851), Anglo-Irish soldier and peer
Richard White, 2nd Earl of Bantry (1800–1868), Irish representative peer 
Richard Grant White (1822–1885), American Shakespearean scholar
Richard White (historian) (born 1947), historian of the American West
Richard White (actor) (born 1953), voice of Gaston in Disney's Beauty and the Beast
Richard M. White, electrical engineer and professor
Richard White, founder of the Foster/White Gallery in Seattle
Richard Von White (born 1951), abstract expressionist artist
Richard Gwyn or Richard White (c. 1537–1584), Welsh Roman Catholic martyr, poet and saint
Richard White, character from Superman Returns

See also
Rick White (disambiguation)
Dick White (1906–1993), head of the British Secret Intelligence Service
Dick White (footballer) (1931–2002), Liverpool F.C. player
Richard Brooman-White (1912–1964), British journalist, intelligence agent, and politician